Connaught Square in London, England, was the first square of city houses to be built in Bayswater. It is named after a royal, the Earl of Connaught who was from 1805 until death in 1834 the second and last Duke of Gloucester and Edinburgh, and who maintained his fringe-of-London house and grounds on the land of this square and Gloucester Square. Its appearance is essentially the same as in the 1820s. Its south-east is 115 metres north of Hyde Park and the same west of Edgware Road. This point is  WNW of Marble Arch, which sits on a very large green roundabout (including sculptures and public fountains) marking the western end of Oxford Street.

Architecture
Connaught Square's architecture is primarily Georgian. Redevelopment was initially planned in the early 18th century and the first of its 45 brick houses was built in 1828 as part of the Hyde Park estate by Thomas Allason.

Community
Residents of Connaught Square hold an exclusive summer party in the central communal garden every year. The garden square is maintained by the owners of the adjoining properties who contribute to its upkeep, and in return are issued keys to the garden. Such gated gardens are a particular feature of this area of London. The horses of the Royal Artillery regularly do their early morning rides down Connaught Street.

Notable residents
In October 2004, serving Prime Minister Tony Blair and his wife Cherie bought as their home a house on this square for £3.5 million; as at 2007 the policing of which was an all-hours rota giving at least four on-duty Metropolitan Police Service Diplomatic Protection Group officers.

Other famous residents have included:

 №5 - Nigel Balchin - author
 №14 - Marie Taglioni - ballerina (resident from 1875 until 1876)
 №15 - Fanny Kemble - actress, author, playwright and poet  (resident from 1877 to 1879)

Other buildings
Aside from predominant residential use, the buildings host a very small primary school and doctor’s surgery. A garage specialises in classic cars on northern approach way Connaught Street. To the west are the shops of Connaught Village and a long-standing Chinese restaurant, which was among the many meeting places of high-level corrupt talks regarding Bruce Grobbelaar, footballer.

In film, fiction and the media
In fiction, Lionel Holland lives at №242 in the film Kind Hearts and Coronets.

Proximity to the Tyburn Tree

The single-most frequented gallows, the Tyburn Tree, for public judicial execution in London, was nearby.  Most sufficient-scale 18th century maps mark out an area by the edge of the top a very broad rise which is a block or so north along Edgware Road as having, in rough drawing to symbolise obsolescence, such a landmark tree. Relatedly, Oswald's Stone or Ossulstone stood for centuries on the corner of Edgware Road and Oxford Street/Road (formerly also called Uxbridge Road), and was an equally prominent landmark of Middlesex and of the most populous hundred (see Hundred Court), providing a cultural focus and marking out the place of early meetings of the justices of the peace and lords of the many Ossulstone manors more generally.  

Peter Ackroyd recites a list of anecdotes and archaeological finds supportive of pre-18th century mass burials where much of Connaught Place stands.  No greater evidence is given for second theory above.

See also
 Connaught Square (Thunder Bay)
 List of eponymous roads in London
 Squares in London

Nearby places
 Knightsbridge
 Notting Hill
 Paddington
 St John's Wood
 Westminster

Nearest tube stations
 Marble Arch
 Edgware Road (Bakerloo Line)
 Edgware Road (Circle, District and Hammersmith & City Lines)

References

External links
 Page at LondonTown.com
 Connaught Square is a part of The Hyde Park Estate

Streets in the City of Westminster
Squares in the City of Westminster
Garden squares in London
Communal gardens